WQPW (95.7 FM) is a radio station broadcasting an adult contemporary format. Licensed to Valdosta, Georgia, United States, the station is currently owned by Blackcrow Media.

History
The station went on the air as WLGA-FM in September 1977, as an easy adult contemporary format. The station shortens its call sign to WLGA on November 30, 1981, and became a full adult contemporary format station which remains to this day. WLGA was Valdosta and southern Georgia's dominant affiliate for Rick Dees Weekly Top 40 in the 1980s, listeners in the area can also listen to the program on Tallahassee's WGLF in a Grade B signal. On October 31, 1988, their call-letters changed to the current WQPW,

References

External links

QPW